Derek M. Wells, KC, (born 28 November 1946) is a Canadian former politician who served a Liberal Member of Parliament for the riding of South Shore from 1993 to 1997.

Early life and education
Born in Corner Brook, Newfoundland, he graduated from Dalhousie Law School in 1972.

Political career
Wells won the South Shore electoral district for the Liberal party in the 1993 federal election. After serving in the 35th Canadian Parliament, Wells was defeated in the 1997 federal election. He unsuccessfully attempted to return to Parliament in the 2000 federal election.

He also served as President of the Nova Scotia Liberal Party, supporting the provincial form of the party, and is a partner at Hennigar, Wells, Lamey and Baker in Chester.

Wells announced in September 2009, that he would seek the Liberal party nomination for South Shore—St. Margaret's in the 2011 federal election, and won the nomination on 4 October. He finished third receiving 16.92% of the vote.

Wells is the current District 3 municipal councillor in Chester Municipality. He was elected in 2021 during a by-election after the seat was vacated by current Progressive Conservative MLA Danielle Barkhouse.

Electoral record

2021 Chester Municipal By-Election 

Nova Scotian Municipal politics do not have party affiliations.

2011 federal election

1997 federal election

1993 federal election

References

External links
Derek Wells law firm bio
 

1946 births
Living people
Liberal Party of Canada MPs
Members of the House of Commons of Canada from Nova Scotia
People from Corner Brook
Nova Scotia municipal councillors